Laccognathus panderi is an extinct lobe-finned fish from northern Europe. They existed from the Middle Devonian to the Late Devonian (around 397.5 to 360 mya).

L. panderi has been recovered from the Middle Devonian Gauja Formation and Late Devonian Amata Formation of Latvia, the Kalmetumägi outcrop of Estonia, and the Lower Frasnian stage rocks of the Kursk region in Russia in what appears to have been either a marine coastal region or a lagoon.

See also

 Sarcopterygii
 List of sarcopterygians
 List of prehistoric bony fish

References

Porolepiformes
Fossil taxa described in 1941
Fish described in 1941
Devonian bony fish